Aqualad is a character appearing in DC comicics.

Aqualad may also refer to:

 Aqualad (Jackson Hyde)
 "Aqualad" (Titans episode)
 Aqualad (Titans character)